Clinton Ferreira (born 5 July 1968) is a former professional tennis player from South Africa.

Biography
Ferreira, who comes from Pretoria, was a two-time All-American doubles player at the University of Alabama. In 1986 he partnered with Gregg Hahn to reach the NCAA semi-finals, which set a college record. He later partnered with younger brother Ellis Ferreira to win the 1989 Southeastern Conference doubles title. The pair were one of the highest ranked doubles combinations in the ITCA collegiate rankings. In 1989 he also competed in the NCAA singles championships and with his brother in the doubles made the round of 16. 

During the 1990s he competed professionally on the ATP Tour as a doubles specialist and won a total of three Challenger titles. He featured in the main draws of both the Australian Open and US Open in men's doubles competition. In 1998 he retired from professional tennis. 

Clinton Ferreira now runs a wine merchant company base in Libourne, France, called Connaisseur Club. He is also captain of the Bordeaux cricket team.

Challenger titles

Doubles: (3)

References

External links
 
 

1968 births
Living people
South African male tennis players
Sportspeople from Pretoria
Alabama Crimson Tide men's tennis players
South African people of Portuguese descent